This page provides supplementary chemical data on lycopene.

Material Safety Data Sheet  

The handling of this chemical may incur notable safety precautions. It is highly recommend that you seek the Material Safety Datasheet (MSDS) for this chemical from a reliable source and follow its directions.

Structure and properties  
All-trans-lycopene with canonical numbering:

Spectral data  
To date, no X-ray crystal structure of lycopene has been reported.

References

Chemical data pages
Chemical data pages cleanup